Endothion is an organic compound used as an insecticide and acaricides. It is part of the chemical class of organophosphorus compounds.  It is generally described as white crystals with a slight odor. It is used as an insecticide, but not sold in the United States or Canada.

Synonyms
 *2-(S-DIMETHYLPHOSPHOROTHIO- METHYL)-5-METHOXY-4-PYRONE
 5-METHOXY-2-(DIMETHOXYPHOSPHINYLTHIOMETHYL) PYRONE-4
 AC-18737
 ENDOCID
 ENDOCIDE
 ENT 24653
 EXOTHION
 FMC 5767
 NIA 5767
 NIAGARA 5767
 O,O-DIMETHYL PHOSPHOROTHIOATE, S-ESTER WITH 2-(MERCAPTOMETHYL)-5-METHOXY-4H-PYRAN-4-ONE
 O,O-DIMETHYL S-(5-METHOXY- 4-OXO-4H-PYRAN-2-YL) PHOSPHOROTHIOATE
 O,O-DIMETHYL S-(5-METHOXYPYRONYL- 2-METHYL) THIOPHOSPHATE
 PHOSPHATE 100
 PHOSPHOPYRON
 PHOSPHOPYRONE
 PHOSPHOROTHIOIC ACID, O,O-DIMETHYL ESTER, S-ESTER WITH 2-(MERCAPTOMETHYL)-5-METHOXY-4H-PYRAN-4-ONE
 PHOSPHOROTHIOIC ACID, S-((5-METHOXY-4-OXO-4H-PYRAN-2-YL)METHYL) O,O-DIMETHYL ESTER
 S-(5-METHOXY-4-PYRON-2-YLMETHYL) DIMETHYL PHOSPHOROTHIOATE
 S-5-METHOXY-4-OXOPYRAN-2-YLMETHYL DIMETHYL PHOSPHOROTHIOATE
 S-5-METHOXY-4-PYRON-2-YLMETHYL O,O-DIMETHYL PHOSPHOROTHIOATE
 S-[(5-METHOXY-4-OXO-4H-PYRAN-2-YL)METHYL] O,O-DIMETHYL PHOSPHOROTHIOATE

Safety
Endothion can enter the body via inhalation, ingestion, and contact with the skin and eyes. Symptoms of endothion poisoning include dyspnea, rales, diarrhea, bronchospasm, bronchorrhea, tachypnea, and opsoclonus, Noncardiacogenic Pulmonary Edema, Salivation.

References

External links

Acetylcholinesterase inhibitors
Organophosphate insecticides
Nitriles
4-Pyrones